Marie Brämer-Skowronek (9 December 1990) is a German Paralympic athlete competing in F34 classification throwing events. Brämer-Skowronek represented Germany at the 2012 Summer Paralympic Games in London, entering the javelin throw and the shot put. She finished tenth in the shot and in the javelin, which stretched over four classifications, she threw a distance of 20.43 metres to win the silver medal. As well as Paralympic success, Brämer-Skowronek won a bronze medal at the 2013 IPC Athletics World Championships in the javelin.

References

External links
 
 

1990 births
Living people
German female javelin throwers
German female shot putters
Paralympic athletes of Germany
Paralympic silver medalists for Germany
Paralympic medalists in athletics (track and field)
Athletes (track and field) at the 2012 Summer Paralympics
Medalists at the 2012 Summer Paralympics
People from Wolmirstedt
Sportspeople from Saxony-Anhalt